The 1980 Ohio Valley Conference men's basketball tournament was the postseason men's basketball tournament of the Ohio Valley Conference during the 1979–80 NCAA Division I men's basketball season. It was held February 28–29, 1980. The semifinals and finals took place at E. A. Diddle Arena in Bowling Green, Kentucky. Two seed Western Kentucky won the tournament, defeating  in the championship game, and received the Ohio Valley's automatic bid to the NCAA tournament. The Hilltoppers drew a 10 seed in the Mideast region, facing the 7 seed Virginia Tech Hokies.

Format
The top four eligible men's basketball teams in the Ohio Valley Conference received a berth in the conference tournament.  After the 14-game conference season, teams were seeded by conference record. The bottom four teams in the standings did not participate.

Bracket

References

Tournament
Ohio Valley Conference men's basketball tournament
Basketball competitions in Kentucky
Ohio Valley Conference men's basketball tournament
Ohio Valley Conference men's basketball tournament
Bowling Green, Kentucky
College sports tournaments in Kentucky